In enzymology, an anthranilate phosphoribosyltransferase is an enzyme that catalyzes the chemical reaction

anthranilate + phosphoribosyl pyrophosphate  N-(5-phosphoribosyl)-anthranilate + diphosphate

The two substrates of this enzyme are anthranilate and phosphoribosyl pyrophosphate. Its two products are N-(5-phosphoribosyl)-anthranilate and diphosphate.

This enzyme participates in aromatic amino acid biosynthesis and two-component system (general).

Nomenclature 

This enzyme belongs to the family of glycosyltransferases, specifically the pentosyltransferases.  The systematic name of this enzyme class is N-(5-phospho-D-ribosyl)-anthranilate:diphosphate phospho-alpha-D-ribosyltransferase. 
Other names in common use are:
 anthranilate 5-phosphoribosylpyrophosphate
 anthranilate phosphoribosylpyrophosphate phosphoribosyltransferase
 anthranilate-PP-ribose-P phosphoribosyltransferase
 phosphoribosyl-anthranilate pyrophosphorylase
 phosphoribosylanthranilate pyrophosphorylase
 phosphoribosylanthranilate transferase
 phosphoribosyltransferase
 PRT

Function 
Anthranilate phosphoribosyltransferase (AnPRT) is a transferase enzyme which catalyses one of the most fundamental biochemical reactions: the transfer of a ribose group between an aromatic base and phosphate groups.  More specifically, AnPRT facilitates the formation of a carbon-nitrogen bond between 5-phospho-alpha-D-ribose 1-diphosphate (PRPP) and anthranilate.

Reaction 
In the aromatic amino acid biosynthesis pathway specifically the tryptophan synthesis portion, AnPRT draws anthranilate and 5-phospho-alpha-D-ribose 1-diphosphate into the active site of the protein. Through the Sn1 mechanism below, AnPRT transfers the 5-phospho-alpha-D-ribose group (shown in blue) to the anthranilate (shown in red) from the diphosphate molecule (shown in black).

Structure 

AnPRT has four domains and its quaternary structure consists of two identical protein structures. Each domain of AnPRT contains a magnesium ion and a pyrophosphate molecule as the active site. The secondary structure of AnPRT consists mainly of alpha helices with a beta sheet within each domain.

Homologues
There are homologues of AnPRT within Saccharomyces cerevisiae, Kluyveromyces lactis, Schizosaccharomyces pombe, Magnaporthe grisea, Neurospora crassa, Arabidopsis thaliana, and Oryza sativa. All of these organisms are alike in the sense that they make all of the amino acids needed for proper protein formation (also called autotrophs).

AnPRT is vital in these organisms because it is a vital step in the pathway to synthesis tryptophan, an essential amino acid in humans, which humans take from eating plants or fungi.

Mutations in AnPRT
(This entire section comes from the paper written by Dr. Robert Last and his collaborators, referenced here:)

An experiment was conducted on the varying mutations in the gene which codes for AnPRT in Arabidopsis. This study focused on the observed fluorescence of Arabidopsis plants when the gene which coded for AnPRT was mutated. It was found that there were nine mutations of the gene all with varying auxotrophic and prototrophic capabilities.

It was discovered that there was an increased level of anthranilate in the cells of Arabidopsis which were mutated. This was concluded to be linked to the fluorescence of the plants.

This study's relevance comes from the applications of the conclusions found by the scientists. The auxotrophic mutant could be used as a selectable marker in plant transformations. This can lead to a better way to engineer plants and find new ways to develop their systems to work for humanities purposes.

References 

EC 2.4.2
Enzymes of known structure
Anthranilates